G (G-flat; also called Ges or sol bémol) is the seventh semitone of the solfège.

It lies a diatonic semitone above F and a chromatic semitone below G, thus being enharmonic to F (F-sharp) or fa dièse.  However, in some temperaments, it is not the same as F.  G is a major third below B, whereas F is a major third above D (a minor third below A).

When calculated in equal temperament with a reference of A above middle C as 440 Hz, the frequency of the G semitone is approximately 369.994 Hz. See pitch (music) for a discussion of historical variations in frequency.

Designation by octave

Scales

Common scales beginning on G
 G major: G A B C D E F G
 G natural minor: G A B C D E F G
 G harmonic minor: G A B C D E F G
 G melodic minor ascending: G A B C D E F G
 G melodic minor descending: G F E D C B A G

Diatonic scales
 G Ionian: G A B C D E F G
 G Dorian: G A B C D E F G
 G Phrygian: G A B C D E F G
 G Lydian: G A B C D E F G
 G Mixolydian: G A B C D E F G
 G Aeolian: G A B C D E F G
 G Locrian: G A B C D E F G

Jazz melodic minor
 G ascending melodic minor: G A B C D E F G
 G Dorian ♭2: G A B C D E F G
 G Lydian augmented: G A B C D E F G
 G Lydian dominant: G A B C D E F G
 G Mixolydian ♭6: G A B C D E F G
 G Locrian ♮2: G A B C D E F G
 G altered: G A B C D E F G

See also
 Piano key frequencies
 G-flat major
 G-flat minor
 Root (chord)

Musical notes